Jacobsen  Holdings Ltd v Drexel [1986] NZCA 75; [1986] 1 NZLR 324 is a cited case in New Zealand regarding property law.

References

Court of Appeal of New Zealand cases
1986 in New Zealand law
1986 in case law
Property case law